Blacks is an unincorporated community in Clayton Township, Adams County, Illinois, United States. Blacks is southeast of Golden.

References

Unincorporated communities in Adams County, Illinois
Unincorporated communities in Illinois